USS Otsego may refer to the following ships of the United States Navy:

 , was a small schooner obtained on loan from the Army in 1840 for action against the Seminole Indians
 , was a gunboat commissioned in the spring of 1864
  was a light draft monitor originally which was renamed Hydra in 1869 and Ostego? later that year 
  was a passenger-cargo steamship built in Germany in 1902 as Prinz Eitel Friedrich which in 1919 served as the troop transport USS Otsego (ID-1628)

United States Navy ship names